The 1983–84 Fresno State Bulldogs men's basketball team represented California State University, Fresno during the 1983–84 NCAA Division I men's basketball season. This was head coach Boyd Grant's 7th season at Fresno State. The Bulldogs played their home games at Selland Arena and were members of the Pacific Coast Athletic Association. They finished the season 25–8, 13–5 in PCAA play to finish 3rd in the conference regular standings. They defeated  to win the PCAA tournament and earn the conference's automatic bid to the NCAA tournament. The Bulldogs lost in the opening round to future Hall of Famer Karl Malone and Louisiana Tech, 66–56.

Roster

Schedule and results

|-
!colspan=9 style=| Regular season

|-
!colspan=9 style=| PCAA Tournament

|-
!colspan=9 style=| NCAA Tournament

Rankings

NBA Draft

References 

Fresno State Bulldogs men's basketball seasons
Fresno State
Fresno State Bulldogs men's bask
Fresno State Bulldogs men's bask
Fresno State